Sylvans S.C. is a football club based on the Channel Island of Guernsey. They are affiliated to the Guernsey Football Association and play in the FNB Priaulx League.

History
The club was formed in 1922.

References

External links
 Official website

Football clubs in Guernsey